SAE Online, formerly SAE Graduate college or International Graduate College, is the trade name of SAE Alumni GmbH, an unaccredited, distance learning, proprietary, for-profit higher education company located in Fürstenfeldbruck, Germany. It provides post graduate courses in Creative Media Industries, as well as several other professional skills courses (short courses) taught by non academic staff.

The university has no campus and no professors. Candidates for a degree are usually required to discuss a project. The school issues unaccredited Master's and even PhDs («Online Graduate College provides post graduate courses from Masters to Doctorate»).

See also
 Educational accreditation
 SAE Institute

References

External links
 SAE Graduate College

For-profit universities and colleges in Europe
Distance education institutions based in Germany
Unaccredited institutions of higher learning